The 1987–88 A Group was the 40th season of the A Football Group, the top Bulgarian professional league for association football clubs, since its establishment in 1948. The championship was won by Levski Sofia, two points ahead of CSKA Sofia. Chernomorets Burgas and Spartak Pleven were relegated.

League standings

Results

Champions
Levski Sofia

Top scorers

References

External links
Bulgaria - List of final tables (RSSSF)
1987–88 Statistics of A Group at a-pfg.com

First Professional Football League (Bulgaria) seasons
Bulgaria
1